The Canada Gairdner Wightman Award is annually awarded by the Gairdner Foundation to a Canadian who has demonstrated outstanding leadership in the field of medicine and medical science.

Award winners
Source: Gairdner- Past Recipients

See also 
 Gairdner Foundation
 Gairdner Foundation Global Health Award
 Gairdner Foundation International Award
 List of medicine awards

External links 
 Canada Gairdner Wightman Award
 The Gairdner Foundation

Canadian science and technology awards
Medicine awards